The fourth season of La Más Draga premiered on 21 September and concluded on 8 December 2021. The competition was broadcast on YouTube, and was produced by La Gran Diabla Producciones. The series featured fourteen contestants, from all over Mexico, competing for the title of La Más Draga of Mexico and Latin America and a cash prize of $250,000 MXN Pesos. The winner of the fourth season of La Más Draga was Rebel Mörk, with C-Pher, Elektra Vandergeld and Iris XC as runners-up.

The judges panel of this season include Mexican singer and actor Roberto Carlo, who was also the main host, hair and makeup artist Yari Mejía, and drag performers Bernardo "Letal" Vázquez and Ricky Lips.

The season consisted of twelve one-hour episodes.

Like the previous season, the castings were followed by a Live Audition held in Mexico City, from which the first ten contestants were selected. Following the airing of the live auditions on March 9, 2021, Georgiana was the only contestant to be confirmed to be cast for the series. The final three contestants, also known as "Secret Contestants", were invited to participate directly by the show's production, and were announced during the premiere.

Contestants 
Ages, names, and cities stated are at time of filming.

Notes:

Contestant progress 
Legend:

Scores history

Lip syncs
Legend:

Notes:

Judges

Main judges 
 Bernardo "Letal" Vázquez, drag queen and professional makeup artist
 Ricky Lips, drag performer and celebrity impersonator
 Yari Mejía, designer, stylist, singer and model

Guest judges 
Listed in chronological order.

 Susana Zabaleta, soprano and actress
 Camila Sodi, singer, actress and model
 Galilea Montijo, TV host, actress and model
 Polo Morín, actor and model
 Bárbara de Regil, actress
 Yuri, singer, actress and TV host
 Regina Blandón, actress
 Capi Pérez, comedian and TV host
 Tatiana, singer, actress and TV host
 Itatí Cantoral, actress, singer and dancer
 Daniela Rodrice, Internet personality

Special guests
Guests who will appear in episodes, but not judge on the main stage.

Episode 2
 Hugo Blanquet, comedian and drag performer

Episode 4
 Fernanda Alvarez, Levi's representative
 Gustavo Helguera, designer

Episode 7
 Neiko, DJ, singer and vocal coach
 Rudy Reyes, runner-up on season 3
 Quecho Muñoz, actor, singer, and writer

Episode 9
 Nathan Damián, Internet personality
 Dani Damián, Internet personality

Episode 10
 Javier García, choreographer

Episodes
<onlyinclude>

References 

Mexican reality television series
Mexican LGBT-related television shows
Drag (clothing) television shows
Reality competition television series
2020s LGBT-related reality television series
2021 in LGBT history